Amissidens hainesi, the ridged catfish, is the only species of catfish (order Siluriformes) in the genus Amissidens of the family Ariidae. This species occurs in marine and brackish waters on the southern coast of New Guinea and Northern Australia, between Darwin and southern Gulf of Carpentaria.

The eyes are large. The lips are fleshy and thin and the mouth is small and almost quadrangular. The barbels are thin and short; the maxillary barbels only reach just beyond eye, and the bases of the chin barbels are close together. The fin spines are thin, long, slender. The adipose fin has a short base and is over the posterior two-thirds of the anal fin. The ventral fin pad of sexually mature females is scalloped and tapered. It is dark grey above and iridescent purple. This fish reaches about 30.2 centimetres (11.9 in) SL.

References

Ariidae
Fish of Papua New Guinea
Fish of Australia
Fish described in 2000
Taxa named by Patricia J. Kailola